Clonakilty Rugby Football Club is an Irish rugby union club. They play in Division 1 of the Munster Junior League.

Clonakilty Rugby Club as it is now was formed in 1977 at a meeting in the Kilty Stone Tavern which has remained the spiritual home of the club ever since. The main reason at that time for the reformation of the club was to provide a social outlet for those involved.

Rugby had been played for periods previously in the town. In 1890 a Clonakilty side competed in the Munster Senior Cup for the first time. The club played their games in The Showgrounds but disbanded in the early 1900s. Clonakilty RFC took the field again in the 1930s when Paul Blewitt, father of former Hon. Sec. Jimmy Blewitt was a stalwart player and administrator. The club disbanded again before the Second World War and was not heard of again until that fateful evening in the Kilty Stone Tavern in 1977.

Clonakilty RFC is located in a small town of approximately 4.000 inhabitants; this is remarkable in that most of the principal clubs come out of Cork (120,000) and Limerick (90,000).

The club commenced competitive rugby at Minor A level and won its first trophy, the Dromleena Cup in 1978. 
Following victories in 1980 and 1982 in the Minor A league it was decided to move up to Junior grade in 1982/83.

The O'Neill Cup was won in the 1995/96 season (against Bandon in the final) and the Junior 1 team won promotion to the 1st Division as well as winning two local cups and the annual "Jimmy Blewitt Memorial Cup" played between Clonakilty and Donaghadee.

In 2001, Clonakilty reached the top of Munster regional rugby and obtained promotion through a round-robin league by winning over champion sides of the three other provinces. Since then, the club won the title of the Senior Third Division in 2006. 
Promoted to Senior second division, and obtained a brilliant third place the following season in the Second Division places. In the following five years a number of trophies were won, bringing the club to new heights, and drawing large crowds on regular occasions. However these great times were to come to an end, when in 2013 Clon were relegated back to junior status for the first time in nine years. The club had struggled all season long, with the countrywide recession hitting the town hard, forcing a number of players to move abroad, including star centre Darragh Lynch. Many other players, overseas signings had to leave, resulting in a sudden drop in numbers in the adult squad. 
The club are extremely lucky therefore, to have such a fantastic underage setup. In 2013 the Under 17s triumphed in The Munster league, and then the same team almost repeated the feat a year later. With a number of that squad currently playing underage rugby with Munster and some even Ireland, there is a strong sense within the club that good times are sure to come again soon, and the onus is now on some of the up-and-coming young men to help Clon climb back up the National Leagues ladder.

Clonakilty Rugby Football Club: playing in the Division 1 of the Junior League. Catering for 3 men's adult teams and under 20's, 2 ladies' teams and the full range of underage teams from under 8's to under 18's.  
Clon RFC have state of the art facilities with a gymnasium.

Honours
AIL Division 3
Winners 2005/2006
AIB Junior Round Robin 
Winners 2000/2001 
Munster Junior Cup
Winners 2000/2001 
Munster Junior League Division 1
Winners 2000/2001 
Munster Junior League Division 2
Winners 1999/2000
Munster u18 League
Winners
Munster u16 League
Winners
South Munster u18 League
Winners
South Munster u16 League
Winners

External links
 Clonakilty RFC

Irish rugby union teams
Rugby union clubs in County Cork
Clonakilty